TV2 is a cable-only TV channel available on Innovative Cable TV in the United States Virgin Islands. TV2 picked up the CBS network on July 13, 2009,
 just two weeks after WVXF, the area's previous CBS affiliate, switched from CBS to This TV. TV2's schedule consists entirely of local and syndicated programming.

TV2 is also available over-the-air on WMNS-LD.

Programming 
TV2's programming lineup includes a local news program, News 2 and other local programs.

 Save More VI
 VI Ambassadors
 Best Bites
 Island Showcase
 21 Questions
 Island Weather Report

Logos

References 

Television stations in the United States Virgin Islands
Television channels and stations established in 2000
2000 establishments in the United States Virgin Islands